Ann Kennedy may refer to:

People
Ann Kennedy, an actress in Meet the Wife
Ann Kennedy; see National Camogie League 1976–77
Anne Kennedy, writer
Ann VanderMeer, née Kennedy
Anne Disbrowe, née Kennedy

Fictional characters
Ann Kennedy; see List of former Coronation Street characters
Anne Kennedy, character in The Abduction Club

See also
Anna Kennedy, school founder
Annie Kennedy, Californian pioneer
Mary Ann Kennedy (disambiguation)